Aepyceros is a genus of African antelope that contains a single living species, the impala. It is the only known member of the tribe Aepycerotini.

Two extinct species are known, Aepyceros datoadeni and Aepyceros shungurae. A third species, Aepyceros premelampus has been transferred to a new genus, Afrotragus.

References

Mammal genera
Mammal genera with one living species
Bovidae
Taxa named by Carl Jakob Sundevall